Dan-el Padilla Peralta (also Dan-el Padilla) is an associate professor of classics at Princeton who researches and teaches the Roman Republic and early Empire, as well as classical reception in contemporary American and Latin American cultures. An immigrant from the Dominican Republic, he rose from poverty and homelessness to show promise, according to one faculty member, as "one of the best classicists to emerge in his generation."

Childhood and early education
Padilla and his family entered the United States legally in 1989, when Padilla was four years old. Padilla's father returned to the Dominican Republic while his mother remained, raising Padilla and his infant brother in homeless shelters in New York City. Padilla's younger brother, Yando, is a United States citizen by virtue of his birth in the United States.

In 1994 Padilla, then living with his family in a shelter in Bushwick, Brooklyn, met photographer Jeff Cowen, who took an interest in the young boy. With Cowen's tutelage and encouragement Padilla won a scholarship to Cowen's alma mater high school, Collegiate School in Manhattan. At Collegiate, Padilla learned Greek, Latin, and French, participated in debate tournaments, and was described by an administrator as "one of the most powerful intellects" to ever attend the school.

University education and career
Padilla applied for early admission to Princeton and was accepted in December 2001. He admitted on his application that he did not have legal status in the United States. Princeton awarded him a full scholarship out of its own funds because his immigration status made him ineligible for federal aid programs. At Princeton Padilla earned a 3.9 grade point average and was named salutatorian of his class.  He majored in classics, studying ancient Rome and Greece. He often took twice the normal course load. He was the 2006 Latin salutatorian of Princeton University, and at the commencement ceremony he delivered the traditional address in Latin.

In early 2006 Padilla won a two-year scholarship for a second bachelor's degree at Worcester College of Oxford University  Attending Oxford would require Padilla to leave the United States, upon which he would likely be unable to return legally due to having no visa. Due to his having been in the United States unlawfully, if discovered, he would have been unable to apply for ten years. Further, without a work visa he would be unable to find work in the United States as a scholar and professor, his intended occupation. Padilla raised $10,000 from his friends for legal support and, in early April 2006, applied for a visa under a United States program allowing visa grants to undocumented immigrants under "extraordinary circumstances". Despite personal appeals from Senator Hillary Clinton (whose husband, Bill Clinton called President George W. Bush on the subject), Charles Schumer, Charlie Rangel, Jane Harman, Mark Dayton, and other members of the United States House of Representatives and Senate, the deans of the Harvard Law School and the Woodrow Wilson School, asking Michael Chertoff and Emilio Gonzalez to personally review Padilla's file, Citizenship and Immigration Services (the agency now responsible for issuing visas) declined to consider his application.

In April 2007 Padilla was issued a one-year H-1B Visa allowing him to work as a research assistant at Princeton while attending Oxford. He worked at Stanford also, before becoming a professor at Princeton.

Padilla successfully defended his Stanford Ph.D. dissertation in Classics in June 2014, and that fall became a Fellow in the of Fellows in the Humanities at Columbia University. As a Fellow he was a lecturer in classics at Columbia. Padilla Peralta was featured in the New York Times Magazine on February 2, 2021, in the article "He Wants to Save Classics From Whiteness. Can the Field Survive?".

Immigration advocacy and memoir 
Along with his academic and political supporters Padilla campaigned unsuccessfully in 2006 for passage of the DREAM Act, which would have allowed high school graduates who had been undocumented immigrants since childhood, to become legal residents if they agreed to attend college or served in the United States Armed Forces. The bill had been introduced several times since 2001, but never obtained enough support to overcome filibusters.

Padilla's story attracted the attention of Hollywood, leading to interest in movie rights and a book deal. Padilla's memoir, Undocumented: A Dominican Boy's Odyssey from a Homeless Shelter to the Ivy League, was published by Penguin Press on July 28, 2015.

Writings

Books 
 
 Undocumented: A Dominican Boy's Odyssey from a Homeless Shelter to the Ivy League. Penguin Books, 2015.

Edited volumes 

 Rome, Empire of Plunder. The Dynamics of Cultural Appropriation, ed. by Matthew P. Loar, Carolyn MacDonald, and Dan-el Padilla Peralta. Cambridge University Press, 2017.

Articles and book chapters

References

External links
personal page - at geocities.com

https://theweek.com/articles/965573/cancel-classics - A critique of Padilla's view of the study of classics

Dominican Republic emigrants to the United States
Collegiate School (New York) alumni
Princeton University alumni
Year of birth missing (living people)
Living people
American classical scholars
Columbia University faculty
Classical scholars of Princeton University